The Hornet incident was an 1871 diplomatic incident involving Spain, Haiti, and the United States. 

During the Ten Years War between Spain and Cubans in January 1871, the Hornet (a small steamship flying the flag of the United States) arrived at Port-au-Prince, followed by two Spanish men-of-war. At that time, the American Navy was yet to achieve the strength that it would later have in 1898. The Hornet was charged with being a pirate, having contraband of war intended for the Cuban insurgents on board. The Spanish asked that the Hornet be given up to them. The United States Minister interposed, stating that the Hornet was a bona fide American steamer. For this reason, Haiti refused to deliver the ship, and remained firm in this decision despite the presence of the Spanish men-of-war in the harbour of Port-Au-Prince and the open threats made by Spain's representatives. On October 5, 1871 the Spanish Consul addressed an ultimatum to the Haitian Secretary of Foreign Affairs, demanding the delivery of the Hornet within 24 hours. 

The dispute became threatening for Haiti when the United States decided to relieve the country of all further responsibility in the matter. In consequence, man-of-war Congress was dispatched to Port-au-Prince, with instructions to convoy the Hornet either to Baltimore or to New York. This steamer eventually left Port-au-Prince in January 1872, which put an end to the controversy between Haiti and Spain.

References

Haiti–United States relations
Foreign relations of Haiti
Foreign relations of Spain
Spain–United States relations
Ten Years' War
1870s in Haiti
1870s in the United States
1870s in Spain